Goryachevo is a rural locality (a village) in Moshokskoye Rural Settlement, Sudogodsky District, Vladimir Oblast, Russia. The population was 15 as of 2010.

Geography 
Goryachevo is located 41 km southeast of Sudogda (the district's administrative centre) by road. Kolychevo is the nearest rural locality.

References 

Rural localities in Sudogodsky District